The Nebi Akasha Mosque, also Okasha mosque or Ukasha mosque, is a historic mosque and maqam located in Jerusalem.

Location

The Nebi Akasha Mosque is located on Straus Street in western Jerusalem, north of the Old City.

History

The tomb of Ukasha ibn al-Mihsan, a companion of the Islamic prophet Muhammad who settled in Jerusalem following the siege of Jerusalem in 637/38, was built in the 12th century CE. According to Islamic tradition, Saladin's soldiers were buried at the site; it became known as the “Tomb of the Martyrs”. Additions were made to the tomb by the Mamluks in the 13th-century. There is also a tradition that Moses, Jesus and Muhammad were buried here, leading the British High Commissioner John Chancellor to name the nearby street Street of the Prophets.

Over a 70-year period in the 1800s, the hill on which the tomb stands was used as a meeting place by students of the Vilna Gaon. These Jews rented the hill from its Arab owners and gathered for study and Friday-night prayers in a tent, joined by local Ashkenazi and Sephardi kabbalists. In the late 19th century, an almost entirely Jewish neighborhood called Ukasha in the Ottoman census lists developed around the tomb with the Jewish housing estates of Sha'arey Moshe or the Wittenberg Houses (called the Waytenberk neighborhood in the Ottoman census) founded in 1885, Even Yehoshua founded in 1891, and Kolel Varsha (called the Rabi Daud neighborhood in the Ottoman census) founded in 1897.

A mosque was built beside the tomb in the 19th century.

20th century

On 26 August 1929, during the 1929 Palestine riots, the mosque was attacked by a group of Jews. The mosque was badly damaged and the tombs were desecrated. As a result of the Palestinian Arab exodus from western Jerusalem during the 1948 Arab–Israeli War, the mosque was abandoned. Today it is located in the middle of a park in a Haredi Jewish neighborhood. It is situated near the junction of Straus Street and the Street of the Prophets.

In December 2011 the mosque was defaced with graffiti by right-wing extremists who tried to set fire to it in a price tag attack. The mosque is inactive and the Jerusalem Municipality uses it as a storage room.

Inscription
The tomb includes the following inscription:  (translation: There is no God but Allah ِand Muhammad is the Messenger of Allah, this is the shrine of our master Akasha, the companion of the Messenger of Allah).

The tomb includes a date:  (1280 AH, or 1863 CE), which was the date of the reconstruction of the tomb.

See also
 Expedition of Ukasha bin Al-Mihsan
 Expedition of Ukasha bin Al-Mihsan (Udhrah and Baliy)

References

Bibliography

Further reading

19th-century mosques
Ayyubid architecture in the State of Palestine
Islamic holy places
Land of Israel
Mosques in Jerusalem
Shrines in Jerusalem